Japanese recording artist Namie Amuro has won numerous awards throughout her career, including 17 Japan Gold Disc Awards, 10 Japan Record Awards, 14 MTV Video Music Awards Japan and 6 Space Shower Music Awards.



Awards and nominations

State honors

References 

Awards
Lists of awards received by Japanese musician